The J. J. Oakes House is a historic house at 14 South Street in Southbridge, Massachusetts.  It is one of a few surviving Second Empire houses in Southbridge.  The two story wood-frame house was built sometime before 1870 for James Jacob Oakes, who grew up nearby, and owned a dry goods and clothing store in town.  The house was later acquired by J. J. Delahanty, who owned a furniture store in the Alden-Delahanty Block in Globe Village.  Although it is predominantly Second Empire in its styling (as indicated by the concave slate mansard roof), it also has significant Italianate detailing, including the three bay facade and bracketed eaves.

The house was listed on the National Register of Historic Places in 1989.

See also
National Register of Historic Places listings in Southbridge, Massachusetts
National Register of Historic Places listings in Worcester County, Massachusetts

References

Houses in Southbridge, Massachusetts
Second Empire architecture in Massachusetts
Italianate architecture in Massachusetts
National Register of Historic Places in Southbridge, Massachusetts
Houses on the National Register of Historic Places in Worcester County, Massachusetts